Jean Földeák (9 June 1903 – 5 March 1993) was a German wrestler who competed in the 1932 Summer Olympics. He was born in Hitiaş near Temesvar.

References

External links
 

1903 births
1993 deaths
Olympic wrestlers of Germany
Wrestlers at the 1932 Summer Olympics
German male sport wrestlers
Olympic silver medalists for Germany
Olympic medalists in wrestling
German people of Hungarian descent
Medalists at the 1932 Summer Olympics
20th-century German people